Attention Attention is the sixth studio album by American rock band Shinedown. It was released on May 4, 2018. It is a concept album, depicting an individual overcoming negativity and related problems to be reborn as a new person. The first single, "Devil," was released on March 7, 2018. The first promotional single, "The Human Radio," was released on April 6, 2018. The second single, "Get Up," was released on August 8, 2018. The third single, "Monsters" was released on March 1, 2019. The fourth single, "Attention Attention" was released on September 24, 2019. All four singles reached number one on the US Billboard Mainstream Rock Songs chart. In November 2021, the album was certified Gold by the RIAA, indicating 500,000 copies sold in the US.

Writing and recording
Initial work on the album began in late 2016, after the band had finished the tour in support of their prior album, Threat to Survival. In February 2017, Smith announced that they had begun work on their sixth studio album. Bass had been working on writing 22 separate pieces of music over the course of their 2016 tour, separate from the rest of the band, who wanted to just concentrate on touring. Bass had just begun presenting the material to Smith, who, while unsure how much exactly would go into the future album, did say that he was very impressed, and that the material may fit together into a concept album, a first for the band. They joined Iron Maiden on tour in Europe in April and May, and began recording soon after. Upon the resuming work on the album and beginning work in the studio, the band decided to actually only use one of the 22 originally proposed songs by Bass, but the work of the original 22 songs still inspired them to press forward in sticking with the concept album idea overall, just with different songs.

In January 2018, Myers announced that the band had finished the recording the album and that Bass was working on finalizing the production and mixing of the album.

Themes and composition
Attention Attention has been described as hard rock, pop rock, alternative rock, and arena rock, with electronic elements. The sound of the album has been compared to bands like Imagine Dragons, Awolnation, and X Ambassadors. Attention Attention is a concept album. The album tells a story of an individual in a very negative mental and emotional place and, over the course of the fourteen songs, has them work through their issues, becoming a completely changed person by the end of the last song. Smith outlined the album's progression:

Myers also described the album's sound as "heavier than Threat to Survival".

Release and promotion
The band tentatively planned to finish the album in late 2017, release a first single in January 2018, and then release the album in April. Plans were eventually pushed back; on March 7, 2018, the title was revealed and the album was announced for release on May 4, and its first single "Devil", was released. The band announced that there would be a video created for every song on the album, and that the video project would be led by Bill Yukich, the lead editor on Beyoncé's Lemonade film for HBO. The band also embarked on a co-headlining tour with Godsmack to promote the release, as part of Live Nation's "Ticket to Rock" program of tours.

On April 5, a second song, "The Human Radio" was released as a promotional single, accompanied by a music video. On August 8, "Get Up" was released as the second single, accompanied by a music video. A third single for the song "Monsters" was released to radio on March 1, 2019 followed by a music video.  Later, an animated video for the song was also released. A fourth single for the song "Attention Attention" was released on September 24, 2019 followed by a music video. All four songs have made it to the top of the Active Rock Charts.  The band plans to release a video for every song on the album.

The band released a film based on the album. The film was directed by Bill Yukich and was released on September 3, 2021.

Critical reception

Attention Attention received generally positive reviews from critics. At Metacritic, which assigns a normalized rating out of 100 to reviews from mainstream critics, the album has an average score of 75 out of 100, which indicates "Generally favorable reviews" based on 4 reviews. AllMusic described the album as "expertly crafted" album that "maintain[s] high energy on 14 tracks of fuel-injected might", concluding that it was a "fun, engaging ride" that "maintain[s] Shinedown's power". Mark Stoneman, writing for Altwire said, "Attention Attention is an easy step up from the band’s previous effort and offers something that is generally fun and rewarding; it’s nothing revolutionary or ground-breaking, but then it was never going to be."

Jessica Howkins, writing for Distorted Sound, stated that "Shinedown have released their best album to date." Howkins calls the album "incredible, raw and strong with very minor flaws." Joshua Leep, writing for Salute, commenting, "the overall vibe of Attention Attention still has that slightly dated mid/late 2000s post-grunge vibe to it. Leep also said, rather than recycling an old sound...Shinedown manage[s] to use this sound to drive home the message of the album even further."

The Sputnik Music staff review described the album as the band's true follow up to Sound of Madness (2008), stating that "There were moments on Amaryllis (2012) – and certainly throughout Threat to Survival (2015) – that Smith’s talents were underutilized, misplaced, and flat-out squandered...with Attention Attention placing the impetus behind Shinedown’s aggressive rock tendencies, Brent Smith is back in his element in a way that hasn’t happened since, well, The Sound of Madness...they both excel at balancing the group’s heavy, southern-rock roots with their infectious pop-sensibilities." Matt Mills, writing for Metal Hammer, was a little less positive calling songs like "Black Soul" and "Kill Your Conscience" "hilarity-inducing head-scratchers." Mills was more positive towards songs like "Devil", "Evolve", and "Brilliant" saying, "the anthems’ bouncing energy already feels destined to ignite live crowds." Music Existence wrote, "overall, it’s a very interesting concept to explore in an album, and one that many listeners can relate to."

Rock 'N' Load  complimented the production and saying "[it will leave] you to enjoy every nuance." Classic Rock gave the album a positive review saying that the album is "punchier" and "angrier even, than previous records." Kerrang! was a little less positive writing, "a couple of tracks...could probably have been left on the side of the road," but praised the album for its "immense vocals" and "thunderous, thirst-quenching melod[ies]."

Track listing

Notes
The Walmart bonus tracks are a digital download release; they are not present on the physical disc. However, the Japanese pressing of the album has the bonus tracks on the physical disc.
All track titles are stylised in all caps except for "Special", which is stylized in lowercase.

Personnel
Adapted from the album's liner notes.
Shinedown
 Brent Smith – lead vocals
 Zach Myers – guitar, backing vocals, piano
 Eric Bass – bass, backing vocals, acoustic guitar
 Barry Kerch – drums

Additional personnel
 Eric Bass – production, mixing, engineering
 Doug McKean – engineering
 Eric Rickert – engineering
 Mike  Fasano  – drum tech
 HooGie J Donais – guitar tech
 Ted Jensen – mastering

Charts

Weekly charts

Year-end charts

Certifications

References

2018 albums
Shinedown albums
Atlantic Records albums
Concept albums